The state treasurer of Minnesota was a constitutional officer in the executive branch of the U.S. state of Minnesota. Twenty-six individuals occupied the office of state treasurer from 1858 until the office's abolition in 2003. The final state treasurer was Carol C. Johnson, a DFLer.

Election and term of office
The state treasurer was elected by the people on Election Day in November, and took office on the first Monday of the next January. There was no limit to the number of terms a state treasurer may hold. To be elected state treasurer, a person must have been a qualified voter, permanently resident in the state of Minnesota at least 30 days prior to the election, and at least 21 years of age.

In the event of a vacancy in the office of the state treasurer, the governor was empowered to appoint a successor to serve the balance of the term. The state treasurer could also be recalled by the voters or removed from office through an impeachment trial.

Beginning with the 1962 election, the term of the office increased from two to four years.

Powers and duties
Throughout the office's existence, the state treasurer served as the banker of state government. This function entailed managing and accounting for the state's cash flows, coordinating banking services for state agencies, collecting receipts, issuing payments, reconciling state bank accounts, and servicing the state debt. Prior to 1983, the state treasurer also administered unclaimed property.

History
A 1998 constitutional amendment abolished the position of state treasurer, effective January 6, 2003. The functions of the office were transferred to the commissioner of finance, who is appointed by the governor and confirmed by the Minnesota Senate. The position of commissioner of finance became commissioner of Minnesota Management and Budget in 2009.

List of territorial and state treasurers

Territorial Treasurers

State Treasurers

Notes on Minnesota political party names 
Minnesota Democratic-Farmer-Labor Party: On April 15, 1944 the state Democratic Party and the Minnesota Farmer-Labor Party merged and created the Minnesota Democratic-Farmer-Labor Party (DFL). It is affiliated with the national Democratic Party.
Republican Party of Minnesota: From November 15, 1975 to September 23, 1995 the name of the state Republican party was the Independent-Republican party (I-R). The party has always been affiliated with the national Republican Party.

References

External links
Past Minnesota State Treasurers